Rodrigo Manuel Bogarín Giménez (born 24 May 1997) is a Paraguayan professional footballer who plays as a right midfielder for Club Libertad.

Career
In January 2019, Bogarín joined Club Libertad.

Personal life
Bogarín has a sister, Dahiana Bogarín, who represents Paraguay at women's youth levels.

References

External links

1997 births
Living people
Paraguayan footballers
Association football defenders
Club Guaraní players
Club Libertad footballers
Paraguayan Primera División players